The 84th Ohio Infantry Regiment, sometimes 84th Ohio Volunteer Infantry (or 84th OVI) was an infantry regiment in the Union Army during the American Civil War.

Service
The 84th Ohio Infantry was organized at Camp Chase in Columbus, Ohio May through June 1862 and mustered in on June 7, 1862, for three months service under the command of Colonel William Lawrence.

It was ordered to Cumberland, Maryland, June 11, 1862, and served provost duty there until September. The regiment was attached to Railroad District, Department of the Mountains, to July 1862, and VIII Corps, Middle Department, to September. Moved to New Creek September 13 to repel the attack on that point by Jenkins and Imboden. Moved to Camp Chase, then to Camp Delaware in Delaware, Ohio, and mustered out October 14, 1862.

Casualties
The regiment lost a total of 14 men, 1 officer and 13 enlisted men during service, all due to disease.

Commanders
 Colonel William Lawrence

Notable members
 Private George A. Garretson, Company E – brigadier general in the Spanish–American War
 Colonel William Lawrence – U.S. Representative from Ohio, 1865–1871, 1873–1877
 Private Daniel C. Roberts, Company C – composer; known for God of Our Fathers, a hymn written for the centennial of the United States Declaration of Independence
 Lieutenant William H. H. Miller – United States Attorney General, 1889–1893

See also

 List of Ohio Civil War units
 Ohio in the Civil War

References

 Dyer, Frederick H. A Compendium of the War of the Rebellion (Des Moines, IA:  Dyer Pub. Co.), 1908.
 Ohio Roster Commission. Official Roster of the Soldiers of the State of Ohio in the War on the Rebellion, 1861–1865, Compiled Under the Direction of the Roster Commission (Akron, OH:  Werner Co.), 1886–1895.
 Reid, Whitelaw. Ohio in the War: Her Statesmen, Her Generals, and Soldiers (Cincinnati, OH:  Moore, Wilstach, & Baldwin), 1868. 
 Woodward, Henry D. Letters from Henry D. Woodward to His Mother (Toledo, OH:  s.n.), 1874.
Attribution

External links
 Ohio in the Civil War: 84th Ohio Volunteer Infantry by Larry Stevens
 National flag of the 84th Ohio Infantry

Military units and formations established in 1862
Military units and formations disestablished in 1862
Units and formations of the Union Army from Ohio
1862 establishments in Ohio